Stuart Andrew Lovell (born 9 January 1972 in Sydney, Australia) is an Australian professional footballer, who played as a striker early in his career, before reverting to a midfield role later in his career.

Playing career
Born in Australia, Lovell spent his childhood in Reading. He joined the local professional team and was part of the Reading team that narrowly missed out on promotion to the Premier League in the 1994–95 season. He had a penalty kick saved in the playoff final against Bolton Wanderers when Reading were leading 2–0; they eventually lost 4–3 after extra time.

After damaging a cruciate ligament in 1997 and almost having his career ended as a result, Lovell moved to Scottish club Hibernian in 1998, ultimately prolonging his career by nearly a decade.

Hibs were in the First Division at the time and he was part of the team who won promotion back to the Scottish Premier League by winning the First Division. He was capped twice by Australia and was a Hibs first team regular as they finished a creditable third in the SPL and reached the 2000-01 Scottish Cup Final.

In the summer of 2001, Lovell surprisingly left Hibs to sign for SPL newcomers Livingston, who he helped to finish third in their first season in the SPL. He subsequently skippered the club to their only major trophy to date, the Scottish League Cup in 2004. Livingston defeated Hibs 2–0 in the final.

Lovell retired after a 15-month spell with Dumfries club Queen of the South, where he also had a spell as caretaker manager.

Post playing career
Lovell has since done media work, appearing on Setanta Sports and Sky Sports, and writing a column for the Edinburgh Evening News. He has also served as a representative of PFA Scotland.

As of 2022, Lovell is a Network Programme Manager for Street Soccer.

Career statistics

Club

Honours

Club
Reading
Football League Second Division: 1993–94

Hibernian
Scottish Football League First Division: 1998–99

Livingston
Scottish League Cup: 2003–04

References

External links 

1972 births
Australia international soccer players
Australian expatriate soccer players
Australian people of English descent
Expatriate footballers in England
Expatriate footballers in Scotland
Association football utility players
Hibernian F.C. players
Living people
Livingston F.C. players
Soccer players from Sydney
Queen of the South F.C. players
Reading F.C. players
Scottish Premier League players
Scottish Football League players
English Football League players
Association football midfielders
Association football forwards
Australian soccer players